Shute Harbour is a coastal locality and harbour in the Whitsunday Region of Queensland, Australia.

Geography 
Shute Harbour is in sheltered port for small vessels located approximately 10 kilometres east of Airlie Beach. Serving mainly as a boarding point for ferries between the Whitsunday Islands and the mainland, it is also home to many charter boat operations and provides the best access to many Whitsunday island resorts and campsites.

The Proserpine–Shute Harbour Road (State Route 59) enters the locality from the west, and ends in the centre.

History 
The island was named by in May 1881 by Captain John Fiot Lee Pearse Maclear of HMS Alert, possibly after a crew-member of that ship.

When the Proserpine Shire Council decided to construct tourist facilities in the area in October 1960, they created a town called Shutehaven. On 31 January 1987, the town of Shutehaven was amalgamated into a larger town of Whitsunday.

Harbour facilities 

Once second only to Sydney’s Circular Quay as the busiest commuter port in Australia and hosting the largest seaplane airbase in the Southern hemisphere, Shute Harbour has faced many years of uncertainty as most ferry operations have moved to marinas in Airlie Beach.  Shute Harbour Transit Facility is managed by the Whitsunday Regional Council.  Major redevelopment plans for the facility have been flagged due to ageing infrastructure, however much uncertainty exists with the nature of these plans.  There are regular bus and taxi services available to and from the port which take the winding road through Conway National Park towards the harbour.

See also

List of ports in Queensland

References

External links

Shute Harbour
Conway National Park

Whitsunday Region
Central Queensland
Ports and harbours of Queensland
Localities in Queensland